Light Pupil Dilate was an American rock trio from Atlanta, Georgia that formed in 2001. They often went by the acronym LPD. Their sound was made by mixing post-punk, hardcore punk, Metal, and space rock. They played their final show on July 30, 2010 at The Drunken Unicorn in Atlanta, Ga.

Members
Eric Searle - guitar, vocals
Mike Chvasta - bass, vocals
Michael Green - drums

Touring and Shows
The band went on tours of the eastern USA in 2004, 2005, and 2007 playing with Harlots, Taming the Shrew, Engineer, Nov.5,1955, and many others. They have shared stages with Dead and Gone, Submission Hold, Totimoshi, Kylesa, Meatjack, Today is the Day, Mixel Pixel, Sleepytime Gorilla Museum, Skeleton Key, Withered, Mastodon, All that Remains, Burnt by the Sun, Cream Abdul Babar, Cutthroats 9, American Heritage and Teeth of the Hydra.

Publications
LPD has been in many publications throughout the years garnering high praise from critics and fans alike. They have been critically acclaimed in publications such as Metal Maniacs, Creative Loafing, Southeastern Performer, Rock Sound Magazine, Decibel Magazine, Outburn Magazine, Revolver, etc.

MetroTrack Station Mastering//Recording/Production
Eric Searle operates MetroTrack Station sound studio Artists/Clients:

Mourdella, Mastodon, Get Damned, Dead Register, Boondak Syndicate, Palaces, Red Rocket Deluxe, Light Pupil Dilate, Magnificent Bastard, Loud
Packets, Iron Whip, Night Time. Go see him, he likes that.

Discography
Cascades (Vert Records, 2003)
Snake Wine (Lifeforce Records, 2007)

References

External links
 Official website

American experimental rock groups
Rock music groups from Georgia (U.S. state)
Hardcore punk groups from Georgia (U.S. state)
Surf musicians
Musical groups established in 2001